Ornica is a comune (municipality) in the Province of Bergamo in the Italian region of Lombardy, located about  northeast of Milan and about  north of Bergamo, at the foot of the Pizzo Tre Signori.

Ornica borders the following municipalities: Cassiglio, Cusio, Gerola Alta, Valtorta.

Demographic evolution

References

External links
 www.provinciabergamasca.com/vallebrembana/ornica/ornica.html